Nausėda is a Lithuanian surname. Notable people with the surname include:

Ann Jillian, born Ann Jura Nauseda, American actress and singer 
, Lithuanian politician, MP
Diana Nausėdienė, Lithuanian business manager and lecturer, the Fist Lady of Lithuania since 2019
Gitanas Nausėda, finansist, 9th President of Lithuania

See also

References

Lithuanian-language surnames